A United States presidential nominating convention is a political convention held every four years in the United States by most of the political parties who will be fielding nominees in the upcoming U.S. presidential election. The formal purpose of such a convention is to select the party's nominee for popular election as President, as well as to adopt a statement of party principles and goals known as the party platform and adopt the rules for the party's activities, including the presidential nominating process for the next election cycle.

Since 1972, the delegates have been mostly selected in presidential primaries state by state. This allows the nominees to be decided before the convention opens. In the 1976 GOP race, Ronald Reagan did well in the primaries but had clearly lost to incumbent Gerald Ford when the convention opened. Other delegates to these conventions include political party members who are seated automatically, and are called "unpledged delegates" because they can choose for themselves for which candidate they vote.

Generally, use of "presidential campaign nominating convention" refers to the two major parties' quadrennial events: the Democratic and Republican National Conventions. Some minor parties also select their nominees by convention, including the Green Party, the Socialist Party USA, the Libertarian Party, the Constitution Party, and the Reform Party USA. The 2020 COVID-19 pandemic forced both the major and third parties to cancel their usual conventions that year and instead schedule virtual affairs with minimal participation, as large energetic crowds risked spreading the virus.

Logistics

Calendars
The convention cycle begins with the Call to Convention. Usually issued about 18 months in advance, the Call is an invitation from the national party to the state and territory parties to convene to select a presidential nominee. It also sets out the number of delegates to be awarded to each, as well as the rules for the nomination process. The conventions are usually scheduled for four days of business, with the exception of the 1972 Republican and 2012 Democratic conventions, which were three days each. (The 2008 and 2012 Republican conventions were also three days each, but in each case was shortened from the scheduled four days due to weather issues.)

There is no statute dictating the order of the conventions, but since 1956 the party to which the incumbent president belongs has held its convention second. Between 1864 and 1952, the Democrats went second every year (except for 1888). In 1956, when Republican Dwight D. Eisenhower was the incumbent, the Democrats went first, and the party out of power has gone first ever since. (Between 1936 and 1952, during administrations led by Democratic presidents Franklin D. Roosevelt and Harry S. Truman, the Democrats had their convention after the Republicans, but it is unclear whether they went second because they held the White House or because they had almost always gone second.) Since 1952, all major party conventions have been held in the months of July, August or (for the first time in 2004), early September. (Election laws in some states would likely prevent conventions from moving into mid-September.) Between the middle of the 20th century and 2004, the two major party conventions were primarily scheduled about one month apart, often with the Summer Olympics in between so they did not have to compete for viewers. In 1996, both were held in August to accommodate the Atlanta Olympics in July, the last Summer Olympics to date to be played in the U.S. In 2000, both conventions preceded the Sydney Olympics in late September.

In 2008 and 2012, the Democratic and Republican conventions were moved to back-to-back weeks following the conclusion of the Beijing and London Olympics, respectively. One reason for these late conventions had to do with campaign finance laws, which allow the candidates to spend an unlimited amount of money before the convention, but forbid fundraising after the convention, for the parties to receive federal campaign funds. However, if Barack Obama's choice not to receive federal campaign funds for the 2008 general election is repeated in future elections, this reason for the late scheduling of conventions will no longer be valid. Another reason for the lateness of the conventions is due to the primary calendar, which ends in early June, and the political party's desire to turn the convention into a four-day tightly scripted political rally for their nominee, which coincidentally happens to have a roll call vote for president. This includes such logistics as where each delegation sits on the convention floor, the order of speeches, how the nominee wants to present him or herself, and allows time for any negotiations in regards to the running mate. Finally, the parties also did not want to schedule their conventions around the Olympics. One reason why the Democratic Party held its 2008 convention after the two-week-long Beijing Olympics was, according to them, to "maximize momentum for our Democratic ticket in the final months of the Presidential election". But moving the conventions later into early September led to conflicts with the National Football League's season kickoff game, which opens the season on the first Thursday of September. However, the NFL accommodated the conventions and moved its games to an earlier start time in 2008, and an earlier date in 2012.

In 2016, both the Republican and Democratic conventions moved to July, before the Rio de Janeiro Olympics in August. One reason why the Republican Party wanted a July convention was to help avoid a drawn-out primary battle similar to what happened in 2012 that left the party fractured heading into the general election. The Democrats then followed suit so they could provide a quicker response to the Republicans, rather than wait for more than two weeks until after the Olympics are over.

The 2020 Democratic National Convention was originally scheduled to take place July 13–16, but was postponed to August 17–20, 2020, due to the COVID-19 pandemic. The 2020 Republican National Convention took place from August 24–27. The Tokyo Olympics, originally scheduled to open on July 24, 2020, were also been postponed, because of the pandemic, to July 2021. This was the first time that nominating conventions did not coincide with the Olympics since 1944, when the games were cancelled due to World War II.

Participation

Each party sets its own rules for the participation and format of the convention. Broadly speaking, each U.S. state and territory party is apportioned a select number of voting representatives, individually known as delegates and collectively as the delegation. Each party uses its own formula for determining the size of each delegation, factoring in such considerations as population, proportion of that state's Congressional representatives or state government officials who are members of the party, and the state's voting patterns in previous presidential elections. The selection of individual delegates and their alternates, too, is governed by the bylaws of each state party, or in some cases by state law.

The 2004 Democratic National Convention counted 4,353 delegates and 611 alternates. The 2004 Republican National Convention had 2,509 delegates and 2,344 alternates. However, other attendees who do not participate in the formal business of the convention dwarf these individuals numerically. These include non-delegate party officials and activists, invited guests and companions, and international observers, not to mention numerous members of the news media, volunteers, protesters, and local business proprietors and promoters hoping to capitalize on the quadrennial event.

Locations

The convention is typically held in a major city selected by the national party organization 18–24 months before the election is to be held, although the Republican National Committee voted in 2022 to allow the party to select its presidential convention sites six years in advance. As the two major conventions have grown into large, publicized affairs with significant economic impact, cities today compete vigorously to be awarded host responsibilities, citing their meeting venues, lodging facilities, and entertainment as well as offering economic incentives.

The location of early conventions was dictated by the difficulty of transporting delegates from far-flung parts of the country; early Democratic and Whig Conventions were frequently held in the central Eastern Seaboard port of Baltimore, Maryland. As the U.S. expanded westward and railroads connected cities, Midwestern locations such as Chicago, Illinois—which since 1860 has held 25 Republican and Democratic Conventions combined, more than any other city—became the favored hosts. In present times, political symbolism affects the selection of the host city as much as economic or logistical considerations do. A particular city might be selected to enhance the standing of a favorite son, or in an effort to curry favor with residents of that state. For example, in 2011, Obama campaign manager Jim Messina noted: "We put the Democratic National Convention in Charlotte, North Carolina in part because we believe so deeply in" a "New South map." Likewise, New York City was selected as the host of the 2004 Republican National Convention to evoke memories of George W. Bush's leadership during the September 11 attacks. Milwaukee, in the politically competitive state of Wisconsin, was chosen as the site of both the 2020 Democratic National Convention (although due to COVID-19 it was essentially not held there), and has been selected to be the host of the subsequent 2024 Republican National Convention.

Having been the site of 25 major party conventions, Chicago, Illinois has been the most frequent host city of major party conventions, hosting more than a quarter of all of them. Chicago has been both the most frequent host of Democratic conventions (hosting 11) and Republican conventions (hosting 14). Chicago was last the site of a major party convention in 1996, when it was the host of that year's Democratic convention. Nine of the conventions held in Chicago took place in the 19th century, and sixteen of them took place in the 20th century. Chicago's frequency as a host significantly dropped-off after the 1968 Democratic National Convention, which saw infamous protest activity and police response, with Chicago only hosting a single convention since.

In the 19th century, the most frequent host city of major party conventions was Baltimore, Maryland, (the site of the first presidential nominating convention). Between 1832 and 1872, Baltimore saw twelve major party conventions. However, the city has only since played host city to a single other major party convention (the 1912 DNC). At the time that it was a frequent host of major party conventions, city was seen as an appealing location for these events due to its accessibility by various means of transit (railroads, steamships, and turnpikes), the presence of several meeting spaces in the city considered spacious by the eras standards, quality hotels in the city, and quality dining in the city. Baltimore is considered to currently lack an appropriate venue by the standards and requirements of modern conventions in turns of seating capacity, space, and logistics. When the city made a longshot bid for the 2004 Democratic National Convention, the city proposed hosting the convention underneath a temporary canopy that would be erected at Oriole Park at Camden Yards (which would have likely necessitated its baseball team tenant to vacate the venue for a roughly two-month period of their season). Potential lack of sufficient hotels has also been cited as an obstacle to Batlimore playing host to another major party convention any time soon.

The conventions have historically been held inside convention centers, but in recent decades the two major parties have favored sports arenas and stadiums to accommodate the increasing capacity, the former because indoor arenas are usually off-season outside of WNBA sites, allowing plenty of time for preparation (the major political parties have avoided baseball stadiums ever since the 1992 Republican National Convention at the Houston Astrodome forced the Houston Astros to play 26 consecutive road games). Bids for the 2008 Republican National Convention, for example, were required to have a facility with a seating capacity of at least 20,500 people, including a convention floor of about 5,500 delegates and alternates; the Xcel Energy Center in Saint Paul, Minnesota was eventually selected. Meanwhile, approximately 84,000 people attended the last day of the 2008 Democratic National Convention at Denver's Invesco Field at Mile High. The last day of the 2012 Democratic Convention was originally also scheduled for an outdoor football stadium, but was moved indoors due to weather concerns. Excepting the pandemic affected 2020 conventions, the last non-sporting venue to host the Democratic National Convention was San Francisco's Moscone Center in 1984. In 1996, the San Diego Convention Center in San Diego became the last non-sporting venue to host the Republican National Convention.

Table of cities (metro areas) by number of major party conventions hosted
Of the 95 major-party conventions held through the 2020 election cycle, 27 different metro areas have hosted conventions. On two occasions, parties had more than one official "host city" their conventions, these being the 1860 Democratic National Conventions, and the 2020 Republican National Convention.

More than half of all major party conventions have been held in just three cities: Chicago, Baltimore, and Philadelphia. 

On six occasions, both the Democratic and Republican parties held their conventions in the same city. However, this has not occurred since 1972. Chicago played double-duty as a host city four times, in 1884, 1932, 1944, and 1952. Philadelphia, Pennsylvania was host of both major-party conventions in 1948, and Miami Beach, Florida was host to both in 1972.

Two metro areas have seen more than one of their municipalities be the site of major party conventions. Minneapolis–Saint Paul is home to Minneapolis (site of the 1892 RNC) and St. Paul (site of the 2008 RNC). The San Francisco Bay Area is home to Daly City (site of the 1956 RNC and 1968 RNC) and San Francisco (site of the 1920 DNC and 1984 DNC).

**Years with multiple convention host cities

Table of states/federal districts by number of major party conventions hosted
As of the 2020 election cycle, nineteen states and the District of Columbia have hosted major party presidential nominating conventions. Thirty-one states have never hosted one (Alabama, Alaska, Arizona, Arkansas, Connecticut, Delaware, Hawaii, Idaho, Indiana, Iowa, Kansas, Kentucky, Maine, Mississippi, Montana, Nebraska, Nevada, New Hampshire, New Mexico, North Dakota, Oklahoma, Oregon, Rhode Island, South Dakota, Tennessee, Utah, Vermont, Virginia, Washington, West Virginia, Wyoming).

On the two aforementioned occasions in which more than one city was the host of a major party's convention(s) (the 1860 Democratic conventions and 2020 Republican convention), the different cities were also located in different states/districts.

Of the 95 major party conventions held up through the 2020 election cycle, more than a quarter have taken place in Illinois. Combined, the states of Illinois, Maryland, and Pennsylvania have been the sites of more than half of all major party conventions. Combined, the seven states that have each held six or more major party conventions (Illinois, Maryland, Pennsylvania, California, Missouri, New York, Ohio) have been the locations of more than three-quarters of all major party conventions.
 
Six states have seen more than one of their metro-areas host a convention: California (Los Angeles, San Diego, and the San Francisco Bay area), Florida (Miami Beach and Tampa), Missouri (Kansas City and St. Louis), Ohio (Cincinnati and Cleveland), Louisiana Pennsylvania (Harrisburg and Philadelphia), Texas (Dallas and Houston)

Up through the 2020 election cycle, states located in the midwestern United States (Illinois, Michigan, Minnesota, Missouri, Ohio, and Wisconsin) have been the locations of a combined 43 major party conventions. States and districts located in the northeastern United States (the District of Columbia, Maryland, Massachusetts, New Jersey, New York, and Pennsylvania) have been host cities of a combined 33 major party conventions. States located in the southern United States (Florida, Georgia, North Carolina, South Carolina, and Texas) have been host cities to a combined 12 major party conventions. States located in the western United States (California and Colorado) have been the locations of a combined 9 major party conventions. The region that has gone the longest since hosting a major party convention is the western United States, which has not been the site of a major party convention since the 2008 DNC was held in Denver, Colorado. 

**Years with multiple convention host states

Delegate selection process

Every year of a presidential election, the United States' political parties have national conventions that result in presidential candidates. However, selected delegates from each state choose candidates rather than members of the public.

Including delegates in the nomination process began after the Presidential election year of 1968, when there was widespread dissatisfaction of the presidential nominating process. Minor-party movements also threatened the chances of Democratic and Republican candidates to win majorities of the electoral votes, which resulted in the reformation of the presidential election process.

Democratic selection process

Each party and state has its own process to selecting delegates.

Generally speaking, delegates of both major parties usually pledge their votes to a specific candidate, and those who are associated with the Democratic Party and are unpledged are considered super delegates. These super delegates may include governors who identify with the party, members of the U.S. Congress, as well as members of the Democratic National Committee. Super Delegates aren't pledged to a particular candidate, and can vote for who they please. Any registered Democrat may run to be a delegate, and wins are based on congressional votes. Once Democrats choose their delegates, they distribute delegates to each candidate evenly, according to the number of congressional district votes they get (must be at least 15%).

Republican selection process

Rule 14 of the Republican Party's national rules determines the size of delegates for each state, territory, or political subdivision. Delegate selection for the Republican Party must take between March 1 and the second Saturday in June in the year that the convention is held (except for Iowa, New Hampshire, South Carolina, and Nevada, which are exempt from the rule and may hold earlier selection processes). The Republican Party uses a "Proportional Allocation" rule, which states that delegates should be based on the statewide votes or the number of congressional district votes in proportion to the number of votes received by each candidate. Also, each state must advocate to have an equal number of men and women in its delegation.

Delegates and alternate delegates for the Republican National Convention may be selected or bound by only one of the following:

 Primary election
 Republican State Committee
 State and Congressional district conventions
 Any method that stays consistent with the rules by which they were selected

Favorite son, Dark horse, Bolter
A powerful state politician, typically the governor or senator, can set up as a "favorite son". The state delegates are pledged to vote for him at least for the first round. Today the role is honorific, but before 1972 control of a delegation gave bargaining power regarding the platform or the nomination. The technique was widely used in the 19th and early 20th centuries. Since nationwide campaigns by candidates and binding primary elections have replaced brokered conventions, the technique has fallen out of use, as party rule changes in the early 1970s required candidates to have nominations from more than one state.

In 1860, Senator Robert M. T. Hunter was Virginia's favorite at the Democratic Party convention. He offered a proslavery voice of moderation amidst the strident rhetoric of secession. In 1952, California Governor Earl Warren was the favorite son at the Republican convention, but he was challenged by Senator Richard Nixon.  Nixon leveraged his way into becoming Eisenhower's choice for the vice presidential nomination.

Dark horse
The term "dark horse candidate" was used at the 1844 Democratic National Convention, at which little-known Tennessee politician James K. Polk emerged as the candidate after the failure of the leading candidates to secure the necessary two-thirds majority.
Other successful dark horse candidates include:
 Franklin Pierce, the Democratic nominee, elected in 1852.
 Rutherford B. Hayes, elected in 1876.
 James A. Garfield, elected in 1880.
 Warren G. Harding, elected president in 1920 after his surprise Republican nomination.
 Wendell Willkie, a businessman who came out of nowhere to win the Republican nomination in 1940. He lost to President Franklin Roosevelt.

Bolter
Delegates to the convention are expected to support whichever candidate wins the nomination. A delegate who refuses to do that walks out—bolts—in public fashion. At the intensely fought 1896 Republican convention, the decisive battle was on support for gold or silver. When gold forces won by tally of 812 to 110, 25 of the 110 bolted while the others supported the party nominee. The next day the bolters formed a new political party, dubbed the Silver Republican Party. It had a strong base of support in the silver-mining Mountain states. The Democratic nominee William Jennings Bryan appealed to the bolters by accepting the Silver Republican nomination; he also accepted the People's party nomination, so he ran on three tickets.

Conservative Democrats from the South bolted the 1948 Democratic Convention to form the States' Rights Party under the banner of Strom Thurmond when Mayor Hubert Humphrey successfully added a civil rights plank to the Democratic platform.

The most notorious instance of bolting was in 1912, when having lost a credentials fight, the supporters of former President Theodore Roosevelt, formed the so-called Bull Moose party, splitting the GOP down the middle and coming in second, something that would never happen again.

Proceedings

During the day, party activists hold meetings and rallies, and work on the platform. Voting and important convention-wide addresses usually take place in the evening hours.

In recent conventions, routine business such as examining the credentials of delegations, ratifying rules and procedures, election of convention officers, and adoption of the platform usually take up the business of the first two days of the convention. Balloting was usually held on the third day, with the nomination and acceptance made on the last day, but even some of these traditions have fallen away in 21st-century conventions. The only constant is that the convention ends with the nominee's acceptance speech.

Platform
Each convention produces a statement of principles known as its platform, containing goals and proposals known as planks. Relatively little of a party platform is even proposed as public policy. Much of the language is generic, while other sections are narrowly written to appeal to factions or interest groups within the party. Unlike electoral manifestos in many European countries, the platform is not binding on either the party or the candidate.

Because it is ideological rather than pragmatic, however, the platform is sometimes itself politicized. For example, defenders of abortion rights lobbied heavily to remove the Human Life Amendment plank from the 1996 Republican National Convention platform, a move fiercely resisted by conservatives despite the fact that no such amendment had ever come up for debate.

Voting
Since the 1970s, voting has for the most part been perfunctory; the selection of the major parties' nominees have rarely been in doubt, so a single ballot has always been sufficient. Each delegation announces its vote tallies, usually accompanied with some boosterism of their state or territory. The delegation may pass, nominally to retally their delegates' preferences, but often to allow a different delegation to give the leading candidate the honor of casting the majority-making vote.

Before the presidential nomination season actually begins, there is often speculation about whether a single front runner would emerge. If there is no single candidate receiving a majority of delegates at the end of the primary season, a scenario called a brokered convention would result, where a candidate would be selected either at or near the convention, through political horse-trading and lesser candidates compelling their delegates to vote for one of the front runners. The best example was the 1924 Democratic Convention, which took 103 ballots. The situation is more likely to occur in the Democratic Party, because of its proportional representation system, but such a scenario has been the subject of speculation with regard to most contested nominations of both parties without actually coming to pass in recent years. It is a common scenario in fiction, most recently in an episode of The West Wing. The closest to a brokered convention in recent years was at the 1976 Republican National Convention, when neither Gerald Ford nor Ronald Reagan received enough votes in the primary to lock up the nomination. Since then, candidates have received enough momentum to reach a majority through pledged and bound delegates before the date of the convention.

More recently, a customary practice has been for the losing candidates in the primary season to release their delegates and exhort them to vote for the winning nominee as a sign of party unity. Thus, the vote tallied on the floor is unanimous or nearly so. Some delegates may nevertheless choose to vote for their candidate. And in 2008 both happened: Hillary Clinton received over 1,000 votes before she herself moved to nominate Barack Obama by acclamation, officially making it a unanimous vote.

The voting method at the conventions is a "roll call of the states", which include territories such as Washington D.C., American Samoa, Guam, Puerto Rico, the U.S. Virgin Islands, and a catch-all "delegates abroad" category. The states are called in alphabetical order (beginning with Alabama and ending with Wyoming). The state's spokesperson (who generally begins with glowing comments about the state's history, geography, and notable party elected officials) can either choose to announce its delegate count or pass. Once all states have either declared or passed, those states which passed are called upon again to announce their delegate count. (Generally, a decision is made beforehand that some states will pass in the first round, to allow a particular state—generally either the presidential or vice-presidential nominee's home state—to be the one whose delegate count pushes the candidate "over the top", thus securing the nomination.)

Vice-presidential voting has been problematic since the beginning: at the 1972 Democratic National Convention, the vote was scattered between 50 candidates and at the 1976 Republican National Convention, the vote was also scattered widely. In 1988, both parties decided to have their designated candidates nominated by suspending the rules and declaring them nominated by acclamation; the most recent vice-presidential roll call vote was at the 1984 Republican National Convention.

If, after the first round of voting, there is no candidate with a majority of votes, subsequent roll calls are held. In between, candidates can make backroom deals, swapping delegates in exchange for positions in the administration or other favors, or candidates can release their delegates to vote for whoever they personally prefer. Roll calls continue until one candidate has a majority: the 1924 Democratic National Convention holds the record as the longest ever, as divisions within the party concerning Prohibition led to 102 ballots between Alfred E. Smith and William G. McAdoo, before the relatively unknown John W. Davis was chosen as a compromise candidate on the 103rd ballot.

Speeches

Minor figures in the party are given the opportunity to address the floor of the convention during the daytime, when only the small audiences of C-SPAN and other cable television outlets are watching. The evening's speeches—designed for broadcast to a large national audience—are reserved for major speeches by notable, respected public figures; the speakers at the 2004 Democratic Convention included Ted Kennedy, a forty-two-year veteran of the United States Senate, and Jimmy Carter, a former Democratic President, while speakers at the Republican Convention included Governor Arnold Schwarzenegger of California and Governor George Pataki of New York, two of the largest states in the nation.

The organizers of the convention may designate one of these speeches as the keynote address, one which above all others is stated to underscore the convention's themes or political goals. For instance, the 1992 Democratic National Convention keynote address was delivered by Georgia Governor Zell Miller, whose stories of an impoverished childhood echoed the economic themes of the nominee, Arkansas Governor Bill Clinton. The 1996 Republican National Convention was keynoted by U.S. Representative Susan Molinari of New York, intended to reassure political moderates about the centrism of the nominee, former Senator Bob Dole. And the 2004 Democratic National Convention featured Senator Barack Obama, whose speech brought the future President national recognition for the first time.

Uniquely, Miller, by then a Senator, would also be the keynote speaker at the 2004 Republican Convention, despite still maintaining his Democratic registration.

The final day of the convention usually features the formal acceptance speeches from the nominees for president and vice president. Despite recent controversy maintaining that recent conventions were scripted from beginning to end, and that very little news (if any) comes out of the convention, the acceptance speech has always been televised by the networks, because it receives the highest ratings of the convention. In addition, the halls of the convention are packed at this time, with many party loyalists sneaking in. Afterwards, balloons are usually dropped and the delegates celebrate the nomination.

History

First conventions

The Federalist Party invented the first national conventions in 1808 and 1812 when they held secret national meetings to pick their candidates. The Democratic-Republican Party never used conventions. Instead its members of Congress met in a party caucuses to select the nominee. Regional conflicts erupted in the hotly contested 1824 election, in which factions of the Democratic-Republican Party outright rejected to take part in the caucus because of its little, heavily dwindling participation and in their view undemocratic character, rejected the eventual caucus nominee, William H. Crawford of Georgia, and backed three regional candidates, nominated by state legislatures, John Quincy Adams of Massachusetts, Henry Clay of Kentucky, and Andrew Jackson of Tennessee (all of whom carried more states than Crawford in the election) instead.

Second Party System

In 1831 the Anti-Masonic Party convened in Baltimore, Maryland to select a single presidential candidate agreeable to the whole party leadership in the 1832 presidential election. The National Republican and Democratic Parties soon followed suit.

1860 conventions
In Chicago, Abraham Lincoln was nominated by the Republicans. The Democratic Party convention nominated Stephen A. Douglas: however, after Southern delegates walked out of or boycotted the convention, they held their own convention and nominated John C. Breckinridge.

Third Party System

Chicago with its central location was the favorite convention city. In addition St. Louis, Missouri, hosted Democratic national nominating conventions in 1876, 1888, 1904, and 1916, as well as the national Republican convention of 1896 and a national Populist convention in the same year. The city had easy railroad access, numerous elegant hotels and expansive meeting facilities. Democrats wanted to meet close to their base in the "Solid South."

1872  Democrats
The Democrats held a very short 1872 Democratic National Convention which endorsed the nominee of the 1872 Liberal Republican convention. The Liberal Republicans were bitterly opposed to incumbent Republican Ulysses S. Grant, and bolted to form their own party. They nominated Horace Greeley, who lost to Grant in a landslide, and the new party soon collapsed.

1884 Republican
In the run-up to the 1884 GOP convention, reformers called "Mugwumps" organized their forces in the swing states, especially New York and Massachusetts. They failed to block James G. Blaine, and many bolted to the Democrats, who had nominated reformer Grover Cleveland.  Young Theodore Roosevelt and Henry Cabot Lodge, leading reformers, refused to bolt—an action that preserved their leadership role in the GOP.

1896 conventions

Fourth Party System

Conventions were often heated affairs, playing a vital role in deciding each party's nominee. The process remained far from democratic or transparent, however. The party convention was a scene of intrigue among political bosses, who appointed and otherwise controlled nearly all of the delegates.

1912 Republicans

Entering the convention, the forces of President Taft and ex-president Roosevelt seemed evenly matched. Taft had better planning, better organizers, and more top convention officials. The camps engaged in a fight for the delegations, with Taft emerging victorious, and Roosevelt claiming that several delegations were fraudulently seated because of the machinations of conservative party leaders including William Barnes Jr. and Boies Penrose. Following the seating of the anti-Roosevelt delegations, California Governor Hiram Johnson proclaimed that progressives would form  a new party to nominate Roosevelt. Though many of Roosevelt's delegates remained at the convention, most refused to take part in the presidential ballot in protest of the contested delegates. Roosevelt ultimately ran a third party campaign as part of the Progressive Party (nicknamed the "Bull Moose Party"). Taft and Roosevelt both lost the 1912 election to the Democratic nominee, Woodrow Wilson.

1924 Democrats

The party was deeply factionalized along regional and cultural lines, with two powerful factions, led by William McAdoo leaving the rural/Protestant/Southern faction, and New York Governor Al Smith representing the urban/Catholic/machine element. The second Ku Klux Klan was flourishing nationwide, although no nationally prominent Democrat acknowledged membership, and the factions battled over a resolution to condemn the KKK. No compromises seemed possible as the convention dragged on for 17 days, with the balloting for presidential candidate being deadlocked for 103 ballots until dark horse John W. Davis, a neutral figure, was nominated.

Naming the younger brother of William Jennings Bryan as running mate was a sop to the rural faction. Oklahoma was a representative border state, with the delegation deeply divided on the KKK issue.

Fifth Party System

1968 Democrats
The Vietnam War energized a large number of supporters of anti-war Senator Eugene McCarthy of Minnesota, but they had no say in the matter. Vice President Hubert Humphrey—associated with the increasingly unpopular administration of Lyndon B. Johnson—did not compete in a single primary, yet controlled enough delegates to secure the Democratic nomination. This proved one of several factors behind rioting which broke out at the Democratic convention in Chicago.

Switch to primary system
A few, mostly western, states adopted primary elections in the late 19th century and during the Progressive Era, but the catalyst for their widespread adoption came during the election of 1968. Media images of the event—angry mobs facing down police—damaged the image of the Democratic Party, which appointed a commission headed by South Dakota Senator George McGovern to select a new, less controversial method of choosing nominees. The McGovern–Fraser Commission settled on the primary election, adopted by the Democratic National Committee in 1968. The Republicans adopted the primary as their preferred method in 1972. Henceforth, candidates would be given convention delegates based on their performance in primaries, and these delegates were bound to vote for their candidate. As a result, the major party presidential nominating convention has lost almost all of its old drama. The last attempt to release delegates from their candidates came at the 1980 Democratic National Convention, when Senator Ted Kennedy of Massachusetts sought votes of delegates held by incumbent President Jimmy Carter. The last major party convention whose outcome was in doubt was the 1976 Republican National Convention, when former California Governor Ronald Reagan nearly won the nomination away from the incumbent president, Gerald Ford.

Television coverage
While rank and file members had no input in early nominations, they were still drawn by the aura of mystery surrounding the convention, and networks began to broadcast speeches and debates to the general public. NBC affiliate W2XBS in New York City made the first telecast of a national party convention, of the 1940 Republican National Convention in Philadelphia, and the other two of the Big Three television networks soon followed. NBC News anchorman John Chancellor said just before the start of the 1972 Democratic National Convention, "Convention coverage is the most important thing we do. The conventions are not just political theater, but really serious stuff, and that's why all the networks have an obligation to give gavel-to-gavel coverage. It's a time when we all ought to be doing our duty."

The presence of journalists at presidential nominating conventions have increased with the television networks. In 1976, the Democratic Convention consisted of 3,381 delegates and 11,500 reporters, broadcasters, editors and camera operators. This is on par with the increase in the number of televisions in American homes. In 1960, 87 percent of people had a television; by 1976, 98 percent did. By the 1992 conventions, network coverage increased from three networks (NBC, ABC and CBS) to five networks (NBC, ABC, CBS, Fox and PBS). At the 1996 Republican National Convention there were approximately seven journalists per one delegate, or about 15,000 journalists.

The increase of the media at these conventions originally led to a growth in the public's interest in elections. Voter turnout in the primaries increased from fewer than five million voters in 1948 to around thirteen million in 1952. By broadcasting the conventions on the television, people were more connected to the suspense and the decisions being made, therefore making them more politically aware, and more educated voters. When scholars studied the 1976 conventions they determined that by watching nomination conventions, even viewers that were not previously very politically active developed a much stronger interest in the election process and the candidate.

Decrease in importance 
With the rise of the direct primary, and in particular with states moving earlier and earlier in the primary calendar since the 1988 election, the nominee has often secured a commanding majority of delegates far in advance of the convention. As such, any actual business conducted at the major parties' conventions (such as the roll call of delegates) have largely become a formality, and the main focus is on promoting the nominee and party platform to a wider audience. For instance, speeches by noted and popular party figures are scheduled for the coveted primetime hours, when most people would be watching.

During the 1996 Republican National Convention (where the RNC had purchased time-brokered blocks of party-produced coverage on the cable network The Family Channel in response to decreasing network coverage), ABC News Nightline host Ted Koppel abruptly ended his coverage of the 1996 conventions, arguing that the events had effectively become an "infomercial" for the party's nominee rather than a bona fide news event. In 2020, political historian Michael Barone argued in an op-ed that the advents of direct distance dialing and television had made the original purposes of the conventions—being "the only place and time where party politicians could communicate frankly and bargain personally", and "discover which candidates had genuine support and which just gave lip service"–increasingly redundant, and that the events had become largely "choreographed" celebrations of the party nominee. 

The changing nature of the conventions, as well as overall changes in television viewing habits, have changed how broadcasters cover the conventions. Coverage of the conventions is now typically relegated to news channels, C-SPAN, and streaming outlets; by 2012, the major networks usually only provided an hour of coverage per-night, focusing on the headlining speakers. PBS continues to provide full primetime coverage of the conventions, although it breaks away from minor speakers and mundane business for analysis and discussion.

COVID-19 affected 2020 conventions 

The COVID-19 pandemic in 2020 forced both major and third parties to modify the format of their conventions to comply with social distancing and restrictions on public gatherings. The Democratic convention was conducted as a virtual event with all speakers appearing from remote locations, and no in-person gatherings of delegates. To fulfill the host city contract with Milwaukee, the event's production was conducted from the Wisconsin Center. The acceptance speeches of Joe Biden and Kamala Harris were held at the Chase Center on the Riverfront in Biden's hometown of Wilmington, Delaware.

Donald Trump repeatedly pushed for the Republican convention to be held in-person as normal. The event was originally scheduled for Spectrum Center in Charlotte; after North Carolina's Democratic governor Roy Cooper refused to allow it to be held at full scale or without mandatory masking or social distancing, the RNC announced plans to move most of the in-person events to Jacksonville, Florida, but still conduct the official business from Charlotte. However, after Jacksonville enacted similar restrictions, and amid nationwide increases in cases, Trump announced in July 2020 that the events in Jacksonville had been called off. 

As with the Democratic convention, the Republican convention was conducted in a downsized form. To fulfill the host city contract with Charlotte, a program of official business was conducted in-person on August 24 with a smaller contingent of 336 delegates, including the roll call. The remainder of the event consisted of primetime programs of pre-recorded speeches, filmed mainly at the Andrew W. Mellon Auditorium in Washington, D.C. The speeches by Vice President Pence (from Fort McHenry in Baltimore), and by First Lady Melania Trump and President Trump (from the White House Rose Garden), were conducted live and in-person with audiences of supporters; CDC-recommended mitigations were largely ignored.

2024 conventions 
The 2024 Republican National Convention will be held in Milwaukee, Wisconsin. The site for the 2024 Democratic National Convention has not yet been chosen.

See also 
 List of Democratic National Conventions
 List of Republican National Conventions
 List of Whig National Conventions
 Libertarian National Convention
 Green National Convention
 Constitution Party National Convention
 National conventions of the Communist Party USA

References

Bibliography
 Arterton, F. Christopher. Media politics: The news strategies of presidential campaigns (Free Press, 1984).
 Becker, Carl. "The Unit Rule in National Nominating Conventions." American Historical Review 5.1 (1899): 64–82. online
 Binkley, Wilfred E. American political parties: their natural history (1962) online
 Carleton, William G. "The revolution in the presidential nominating convention." Political Science Quarterly 72.2 (1957): 224–240. online
 Chase, James S. Emergence of the Presidential Nominating Convention, 1789–1832 (Houghton Mifflin: 1973).
 Chester, Edward W  A guide to political platforms (1977) pp 127–135 online
 Congressional Research Service. Presidential Elections in the United States: A Primer. (Washington, Congressional Research Service, 2000).
 Costain, Anne N. "An analysis of voting in american national nominating conventions, 1940–1976." American Politics Quarterly 6.1 (1978): 95–120.
 Cowan, Geoffrey. Let the People Rule: Theodore Roosevelt and the Birth of the Presidential Primary (WW Norton & Company, 2016).
 Davis, James W. National conventions in an age of party reform (Greenwood, 1983).
 Eaton, Herbert. Presidential timber: A history of nominating conventions, 1868–1960 (1964) online.
 Key, Jr., V.O. Politics, Parties, and Pressure Groups (4th ed. 1958) pp 414–470. online
 Miles, Edwin A. "The keynote speech at national nominating conventions." Quarterly journal of Speech 46.1 (1960): 26–31.
 Morison, Samuel E. "The First National Nominating Convention, 1808." American Historical Review 17.4 (1912): 744–763. on 1808 Federalists online
 Murdock, John S. "The First National Nominating Convention." American Historical Review 1.4 (1896): 680–683. online on 1812 Federalists
 Nichols, Roy F. "It Happens Every Four Years," American Heritage (June 1956) 7#4 pp 20–33.
 Pfau, Michael William. "Conventions of Deliberation? Convention Addresses and Deliberative Containment in the Second Party System' Rhetoric and Public Affairs 9#4 (2006), pp. 635–654 online
 Republican National Convention 2004: Convention History
 Sautter, R. Craig, and Edward M. Burke. Inside the Wigwam: Chicago Presidential Conventions, 1860–1996 (Loyola Press, 1996).
 Silver, Adam. "Consensus and Conflict: A Content Analysis of American Party Platforms, 1840–1896." Social Science History 42.3 (2018): 441–467 online.

Primary sources
 Chester, Edward W  A guide to political platforms (1977) online
 Porter, Kirk H. and Donald Bruce Johnson, eds. National party platforms, 1840–1964 (1965) online 1840–1956

External links
 NewsHour: Interview with Historian Michael Beschloss on the origins of the convention process
 History House: Conventional Wisdom
 National Party Conventions eGuide, The Campaign Finance Institute, 
Corpus of Political Speeches Free access to political speeches by American and other politicians, developed by Hong Kong Baptist University Library

 
Political party assemblies
United States presidential primaries